Anatolie Arhire (born 20 July 1956 in Ungheni) is a Moldovan politician, deputy in the Parliament of Moldova since 2009.

Studies
 1977-1982: Agricultural State University of Moldova, Chișinău, specialty Hydrotechnic Engineer

Professional activity
 From July 2007 to 5 April 2009: Vice-President of Ungheni District, responsible for Agriculture, Infrastructure, Land and Cadastre
 From 5 April 2009: deputy in the Parliament of the Republic of Moldova, Member of the Agriculture and Food Industry Commission

External links 
 Anatol Arhire pe site-ul Parlamentului Republicii Moldova (old style)
 Site-ul Partidului Liberal

References

1956 births
Living people
Liberal Party (Moldova) MPs
Moldovan MPs 2009–2010
Moldovan MPs 2009
Romanian Popular Party politicians
People from Ungheni